George Pastell (13 March 1923 – 4 April 1976) was a Cypriot character actor in British films and television programmes. Sources vary as to whether his real name was Nino (IMDb) or George Pastellides (BFI). His marriage record gives his name as Georgiou Pastellides while his RADA record lists his name as George Pastel.

Early life 
Born to a French mother and Greek father, Pastell began his career spending two years in banking. Aged 21, he joined the Greek National Theatre. Leaving Cyprus a few years later with only £50 in his pocket, Pastell came to England, scarcely able to speak much English. However, he studied the language by taking evening classes at the Pitman School and soon graduated from the Royal Academy of Dramatic Art.

Career
He made his film debut in Give Us This Day (1949), credited as Nino Pastellides, and played villains in film and television. He was often cast by Hammer Film Productions as Eastern characters such as Mehemet Bey in The Mummy (1959), the High Priest of Kali in The Stranglers of Bombay (1960), Inspector Etienne in Maniac (1963), and Hashmi Bey in The Curse of the Mummy's Tomb (1964).

His exotic looks often saw him cast in spy films of the '60s such as From Russia with Love (1963); Licensed to Kill (1965); A Man Could Get Killed (1966); That Riviera Touch (1966); and Deadlier Than the Male (1967). He also appeared in the films Tiger Bay, The Angry Hills (1959), The Siege of Sidney Street (1960), Konga, The Frightened City (1961), On the Beat (1962), The Moon-Spinners (1964), The Long Duel (1967) and The Magus (1968).

He also appeared as the villain in the '60s television series Danger Man; The Avengers (1966 episode "Honey For the Prince"); Doctor Who; The Champions; The Saint; and Department S.

Pastell had dual citizenship between the United Kingdom and United States with homes in Miami, Florida and Manhattan. He was a member of the Screen Actors Guild as well as a theatrical instructor for Pasadena Playhouse. After retiring from the acting industry in 1969, Pastell spent his final years touring the nation, performing in musical theatre with his wife.

Death
He died on 4 April 1976 from a heart attack.

Selected filmography

 Adam and Evelyne (1949) - Headwaiter at Restaurant (uncredited)
 Madness of the Heart (1949) - Waiter
 Give Us This Day (1949) - The Lucy 
 Moulin Rouge (1952) - Man at First Bar (uncredited)
 The Gambler and the Lady (1952) - Jacko Spina
 Deadly Nightshade (1953) - Ferrari (uncredited)
 South of Algiers (1953) - Hassan
 Blind Spot (1958) - Schrieder
 Battle of the V-1 (1958) - Eryk
 Tiger Bay (1959) - 'POLOMA' Captain
 Deadly Record (1959) - Angelo
 The Angry Hills (1959) - Papa Panos
 The Mummy (1959) - Mehemet Bey
 The Stranglers of Bombay (1959) - High Priest of Kali
 Bottoms Up (1960) - Swarthy Man
 The Siege of Sidney Street (1960) - Brodsky
 Konga (1961) - Prof. Tagore
 The Frightened City (1961) - Sanchetti
 Village of Daughters (1962) - 2nd Pickpocket
 Masters of Venus (1962) - Kallas
 On the Beat (1962) - Manzini
 Tarzan's Three Challenges (1963) - Khan (voice, uncredited)
 Impact (1963) - Sebastian 'The Duke' Dukelow
 Maniac (1963) - Inspector Etienne
 From Russia with Love (1963) - Train Conductor
 The Secret Door (1964) - Antonio
 The Moon-Spinners (1964) - Police lieutenant
 The Curse of the Mummy's Tomb (1964) - Hashmmi Bey
 Danger Man (television series; 'The Colonel's Daughter') (1964) - Petel
 The High Bright Sun (1965) - Prinos
 The Intelligence Men (1965) - Assassin (uncredited)
 She (1965) - Haumeid (voice, uncredited)
 Licensed to Kill (1965) - Second Russian Commisar
 Out of the Unknown ('No Place Like Earth', episode) (1965) - Major Kahn
 A Man Could Get Killed (1966) - Lazlo
 That Riviera Touch (1966) - Ali
 Khartoum (1966) - Giriagis Bey (uncredited)
 Run with the Wind (1966) - Lennie
 Deadlier Than the Male (1967) - Carloggio
 The Long Duel (1967) - Ram Chand
 The Magus (1968) - Andreas-Priest
 Vendetta for the Saint (1969) - Marco Ponti

References

External links

George Pastell at Theatricalia

1923 births
1976 deaths
British male film actors
British male television actors
Cypriot male actors
20th-century British male actors
Cypriot expatriates in the United Kingdom
Cypriot emigrants to the United States
Alumni of RADA